Thomas Hilton may refer to:

Thomas Hilton (by 1500 – 1559), MP for Northumberland
Thomas Hilton (by 1508 – 1558 or later), MP for Old Sarum
Thomas Hilton, see List of colonial governors of New Hampshire